Tipton-Rosemark Academy (often abbreviated TRA) is a private Christian school in Shelby County, Tennessee, United States. It is in the community of Rosemark, and near the border of Shelby and Tipton County.

History 
Tipton-Rosemark Academy's inception came after local residents became concerned about their children's education following the removal of required government-sponsored Bible reading from public schools. An elementary school was established in a house in Munford, Tennessee and was christened Tipton Academy, after the county in which the school then resided.

In 1967, a new facility was built in the nearby town of Brighton, Tennessee. In 1970, a kindergarten was added to the Brighton location, doubling the size of the establishment. In the same year, Tipton Academy purchased Rosemark School from Shelby County in hopes of expanding the academy into grades 9–12. The newly acquired school was named Rosemark Academy. Some historians have cited Rosemark Academy as an example of a segregation academy.

In 1980, Rosemark Academy was forced to cancel a football game at Pioneer Christian Academy because Pioneer Christian administrators felt that the Rosemark Academy cheerleader's uniforms were too revealing.

Seventh and eighth grades were moved to the Rosemark Academy in 1986 as the first step to consolidate all grades to the Rosemark campus.

As part of the consolidation process, a new elementary school building was constructed in 1988. The decision was then made to combine the names of the two schools, thus creating the modern name of Tipton-Rosemark Academy.

In 1998, a capital campaign was begun for the construction of a separate middle school building. $550,000 was raised, and groundbreaking for the new building occurred in the fall of 1999.

Also in 1999, a $1,000,000 donation was made to the school by the estate of Paul Barret, Jr. The money was used to buy land adjacent to school property, and to begin dirt work on a sporting complex, later named the Paul Barret, Jr. Sportsplex. The project was finished in 2006, with the first home varsity football game being September 1 of that year. Lights over the baseball and softball fields, as well as a concession stand, were added in 2008.

A new capital campaign began in 2006. Entitling it the Continuing the Tradition Campaign, TRA used the campaign to raise funds for the building of a new high school, as well as an addition to the existing elementary school. With the new football fields constructed, the new building was built on the obsolete Rebel Football Field, where TRA had hosted football games since 1970. When the high school was completed, it was adjoined to the existing middle school, allowing students to transit between the buildings without leaving the indoors.

In 2008, it was announced that the old Rosemark School building was to be torn down to make room for new performing arts building. In addition to the proposed performing arts center, the antiquated building had been deemed legally unfit to use by updated fire codes. A fundraiser was hastily put together by local residents and alumni who wished to see the building preserved. The measure fell short of its goal, and the school was demolished only a month following the school's announcement. The corner stones of the historic building were saved and used as the basis of the new performing arts building.

The Head of School at Tipton-Rosemark Academy is Dr. Andy Graham, Jr.. He was appointed to the position in July 2021.

Athletics 
TRA is a member of the TSSAA, classified as Division II, Class A West. The school's mascot is the Rebel, and all sports teams are known as the TRA Rebels. Football, basketball, volleyball, soccer, softball, baseball, tennis, golf, cross country, and cheerleading are offered as varsity athletics.

References 

Schools in Shelby County, Tennessee
Segregation academies in Tennessee
Private K-12 schools in Tennessee
1965 establishments in Tennessee
Educational institutions established in 1965